The Player of the Year Trophy is an award given by Ice Hockey Journalists UK (formally the British Ice Hockey Writers Association) to the MVP in the Elite League and the English Premier League at the end of each season. In previous seasons it has been awarded to players in the British Hockey League's Premier and First Divisions, the Super League and the British National League. The trophy was first awarded in 1985.

Tony Hand has won the trophy the most times, with a total of six awards. Steve Moria has won three times. Rick Fera, Mark Morrison, Scott Morrison, Lukas Smital and Randy Smith have each won the trophy on two occasions.

Player of the Year Trophy winners

See also
Man of Ice Awards

References
Ice Hockey Journalists UK
The Internet Hockey Database
Eurohockey

British ice hockey trophies and awards
United K
Ice hockey players in the United Kingdom
Awards established in 1985
1985 establishments in the United Kingdom
Annual events in the United Kingdom